Marija Vučković (born 3 July 1974) is a Croatian politician serving as Minister of Agriculture . She assumed the minister position in the first cabinet led by Prime Minister Andrej Plenković, and continued to hold the position in his second cabinet.

Personal life 

She studied at the University of Zagreb.

See also
 Cabinet of Andrej Plenković I
 Cabinet of Andrej Plenković II

References 

Living people
1974 births
Politicians from Mostar
Croatian Democratic Union politicians
21st-century Croatian women politicians
21st-century Croatian politicians
Women government ministers of Croatia
University of Zagreb alumni

Croats of Bosnia and Herzegovina